Gino Vendetti is a former Canadian Paralympic athlete. He competed in para-athletics and in powerlifting and he won three silver medals and a bronze medal at the Summer Paralympics. He won a silver medal in powerlifting at the 1984 Summer Paralympics held in Stoke Mandeville, United Kingdom and New York City, United States. He also won the bronze medal in the men's 800 metres C4 event. At the 1988 Summer Paralympics held in Seoul, South Korea, he won the silver medal in both the men's 200 metres C4-5 and the men's 400 metres C4-5 events.

In 2015, he carried the torch as part of the torch relay of the Pan American Games held in Toronto, Canada.

References

External links 
 

Living people
Year of birth missing (living people)
Place of birth missing (living people)
Paralympic track and field athletes of Canada
Athletes (track and field) at the 1984 Summer Paralympics
Athletes (track and field) at the 1988 Summer Paralympics
Paralympic silver medalists for Canada
Paralympic bronze medalists for Canada
Medalists at the 1984 Summer Paralympics
Medalists at the 1988 Summer Paralympics
Paralympic medalists in athletics (track and field)
Paralympic medalists in powerlifting
Canadian male sprinters
Canadian male middle-distance runners
Canadian powerlifters
Powerlifters at the 1984 Summer Paralympics
20th-century Canadian people